Aaron of Jerusalem, also known as Abū al-Faraj Hārūn ibn al-Faraj (Judeo-Arabic ), was a Karaite Jewish scholar of the eleventh century who resided in Jerusalem.

Grammarian
Little was known of Aaron until Adolf Neubauer discovered, among the manuscript collection of Abraham Firkovich in Saint Petersburg, important fragments in Arabic of the Mushtamil "The Comprehensive", a Hebrew grammar consisting of eight books. Bacher, while studying these fragments, succeeded in rediscovering the unknown grammarian. Samuel Abraham Poznański published some valuable specimens of Aaron's work; and, following a suggestion of Abraham Harkavy, he threw new light on the author and some other works of his: namely, the Kitab al-Kafi, a commentary on the Torah, often quoted by Karaite writers, and a lexicographical work bearing the title Sharḥ al-Alfaẓ, a part of which is extant in the British Museum.

He was acknowledged by the Rabbanites as one of the principal representatives of Karaitic learning and as a great authority on grammar and exegesis. He is quoted by Abraham ibn Ezra in the preface to his Moznayim as "the sage of Jerusalem, not known to me by name, who wrote eight books on grammar, as precious as sapphire." Moses ibn Ezra refers to him as "the sage of Jerusalem who wrote the Mushtamil, and also quotes him as "Sheik Abu al-Faraj of Jerusalem, who is no adherent of our religious community." Judah ibn Balaam likewise mentions "the grammarian of the Holy City"; and Jonah ibn Janah in his Riqmah relates that Jacob de Leon brought him from Jerusalem "the copy of a book by an author who lived there, but whose name he refrains from mentioning," because, as Bacher surmises, he was a Karaite.

Abu al-Faraj occasionally cites from the Hebrew-Arabic dictionary compiled by David ben Abraham al-Fasi.

References
 Fürst, Gesch. d. Karäert. i. 99, 100;
 Bacher, in Rev. Ét. Juives, xxx. 232-256;
 Poznanski, ibid., 1896, xxxiii. 24-39, 197-218;
 Pinsker, Liḳḳuṭe Ḳadmoniot, pp. 109 et seq.
 Khan, Geoffrey, The Tiberian Pronunciation Tradition of Biblical Hebrew, Volume II, Cambridge, UK: Open Book Publishers, doi:10.11647/OBP.0194, 2020

External links
 Source

Karaite rabbis
11th-century rabbis in Jerusalem
Scientists from Jerusalem
Medieval Hebraists
Jewish grammarians
Linguists of Hebrew
Grammarians of Hebrew